Acerentulus keikoae is a species of proturan in the family Acerentomidae. It is found in Southern Asia.

Subspecies
These two subspecies belong to the species Acerentulus keikoae:
 Acerentulus keikoae capillatus Imadaté, 1988
 Acerentulus keikoae keikoae Imadaté, 1988

References

Further reading

 

Protura
Articles created by Qbugbot
Animals described in 1988